Mytilina is a genus of rotifers belonging to the family Mytilinidae.

The genus has almost cosmopolitan distribution.

Species:
 Mytilina acanthophora Hauer, 1938 
 Mytilina bicarinata (Perty, 1850)

References

Rotifer genera
Ploima